Port Erin Women's Detention Camp was a World War II internment camp on the Isle of Man at Port Erin. It was Europe's only all-female internment camp. Notable internees included Dora Diamant the lover of Franz Kafka in the last year of his life, and Fay Taylour, champion motorcycle, speedway and racing car driver.

Other camps

Other WWII internment camps at on the Isle of Man included the Hutchinson Internment Camp in Douglas, noted as “the artists’ camp”, the Metropole Internment Camp also in Douglas, predominantly for Italians, Sefton Internment Camp on the promenade in Douglas, the Peel Internment Camp, and Mooragh Internment Camp in Ramsey. Rushen Camp was later established for couples, but run by civilian owners who remained in the camp, instead of the military.

Notable internees

 Hedy Bienenfeld (1907–1976), Austrian-American Olympic swimmer

References

Internment camps in the Isle of Man
Women in World War II
History of women in the United Kingdom